is a Japanese actor.

Biography

Ito is best known for starring in the hit franchise Umizaru film series, which consistently topped the Japanese box office of the year. He has also head-lined many other major Japanese films such as Takashi Miike's Sukiyaki Western Django (2007) and Lesson of the Evil (2012) and is featured in many others.

Personal life
Hideaki Ito was born in a hospital in Nagasaki. His family includes his father, mother and a younger sister. He lived in Tokyo when he was a child, and moved back to his hometown of Gifu when he was 4 years old. He was frail, sick and diagnosed with chronic kidney disease when he was in kindergarten. He began to be hospitalized for a long time. After attending elementary school, he was discharged and hospitalized continuously.

Ito is good at sports. His hobbies include horse riding, diving, surfing, skiing, skydiving, etc. He is qualified as a professional dive instructor. He likes manga, anime, video games. He is also a fan of Star Wars.

In October 2014, Hideaki Ito published a marriage announcement and registered his marriage with a woman on the 24th.

Filmography

Film

 Himitsu (1999)
 Pyrokinesis (2000) 
 Blister (2000)
 The Princess Blade (2001)
 Onmyoji (2001)
 Love Song (2001)
 When the Last Sword Is Drawn (2003), as Tokugawa Yoshinobu
 Onmyoji 2 (2003)
 Umizaru (2004)
 Kono Mune Ippai no Ai o (2005)
 Umizaru 2: Limit of Love (2006)
 Sukiyaki Western Django (2007)
 252: Seizonsha Ari (2008)
 Kamui Gaiden (2009)
 Umizaru 3: The Last Message (2010)
 Andalusia: Revenge of the Goddess (2011)
 Umizaru 4: Brave Hearts (2012)
 Lesson of the Evil (2012)
 Wood Job! (2014), as Yoki Iida
 Terra Formars (2016)
 March Comes in like a Lion (2017), as Gotō Masamune
 March Goes out like a Lamb (2017), as Gotō Masamune
 Memoirs of a Murderer (2017), as Detective Makimura Kō
 Kamen Rider Zero-One the Movie: Real×Time (2020), as Esu/Kamen Rider Eden
 The Doorman (2020), as Leo
 Baragaki: Unbroken Samurai (2021), as Serizawa Kamo
 Kappei (2022), as Kappei
 The Legend and Butterfly (2023), as Fukuzumi Heitarō Sadaie

Television

 Dessin (1997)
 Bayside Shakedown (1997)
 Boy Hunt (1998)
 Ai Tokidoki Uso (1998)
 Yamada Ikka no Shinbou (1999)
 Out: Tsumatachi no Hanzai (1999)
 Over Time (1999)
 Ai o Kudasai (2000)
 Yasha (2000)
 Koi o Nan-nen Yasundemasuka (2001)
 Le Parfum De La Jaolusie (2001)
 Kyumei Byoto 24 Ji 2 (2001)
 Joshiana (2001)
 Baka Sankyodai (2001)
 Akahige (2002)
 Tentai Kansoku (2002)
 Toshiie to Matsu (2002), Maeda Toshinaga
 Mayonaka no Ame (2002)
 Ai to Shihon Shugi (2003)
 Namahoso wa Tomaranai (2003)
 Shiroi Kyotō (2003)
 The Princess Blade (2003)
 Boku no Mahotsukai (2003)
 Atsuki Yume no Hi (2004)
 Kyumei Byoto 24 Ji 3 (2005)
 Kunitori Monogatari (2005)
 Umizaru Evolution (2005)
 Bengoshi no Kuzu (2006)
 First Kiss (2007)
 Kodoku no Kake (2007)
 Akechi Mitsuhide (2007)
 Wachigaiya Itosato (2007)
 Buzzer Beat (2009)
 Carnation (2011)
 Koukousei Restaurant (2011)
 Last Money: Ai no Nedan (2011)
 Doubles: Futari no Keiji (2013)
 Zainin no Uso (2014)
 The Emperor's Cook (2015)
 Liquid: Oni no Sake, Kiseki no Kura (2015)
 Mutsu: Mieru Me (2015)
 Boku no Yabai Tsuma (2016)
 Kirin ga Kuru (2020), Saitō Yoshitatsu
 Kamen Rider Zero-One (2020), Esu/Kamen Rider Eden
 Age of Samurai: Battle for Japan (2021), Date Masamune
 Tokyo Vice (2022), Miyamoto
 Umeko: The Face of Female Education (2022), Tsuda Sen
 Love with a Case (2022), Naruhito Yukimatsu
 Galápagos (2023), Torii

Awards and nominations

Bibliography
 ID4 (2001)
 Hideakizm (2001)
 Morocco (2002)

References

External links
 Official Personal web site

1975 births
Living people
People from Gifu
Japanese male film actors
Japanese male television actors
Japanese racehorse owners and breeders
20th-century Japanese male actors
21st-century Japanese male actors